Dead Woman's Ditch is an earthwork which has been scheduled as an ancient monument in Over Stowey, Somerset, England situated on the Quantock Hills.

The earthwork is presumed to be of prehistoric origin and is of unknown purpose, but has been linked to Dowsborough.

It is badly eroded in places and is on the Heritage at Risk Register. Part of the earthwork is on land owned by the Forestry Commission.

Dead Woman's Ditch is sometimes associated with the murder of Jane Walford by her husband John in 1789 but the name predates the murder, appearing on an earlier map. In 1988 the body of Shirley Banks was found 1 mile from the site; John Cannan was found guilty of her murder.

While walking in or around Dead Woman's Ditch people have reported that they were able to hear the faint words of Jane Walford.

References

Archaeological sites in Somerset
Linear earthworks